Bernd Hiller (born 26 February 1942) is a German former ice hockey player who competed for SC Dynamo Berlin. He played for the East Germany national ice hockey team at the 1968 Winter Olympics in Grenoble.

References

External links
 

1942 births
Living people
German ice hockey forwards
Ice hockey people from Berlin
Ice hockey players at the 1968 Winter Olympics
Olympic ice hockey players of East Germany
SC Dynamo Berlin (ice hockey) players